G. Bell may refer to:

 Graham E. Bell, American amateur astronomer and prolific discoverer of minor planets
 G. Bell & Sons, book publishing in London, from 1839 to 1986